Judita may refer to:

People
Judita Čeřovská (1929–2001), German-Czech singer
Judita Cofman (1936–2001), Yugoslav-German mathematician
Judita Leitaitė (born 1959), Lithuanian opera singer
Judita Popović (born 1956), Serbian politician
Judita Wignall, Member of Halo Friendlies
Judith of Thuringia, second wife of Duke and later King Vladislaus II of Bohemia and after 1158 the second Queen of Bohemia.

Others
 Judita, a Croatian epic poem, but may also refer to:
 HSC Judita (built 1990), a high speed craft owned and operated by Croatian shipping company Jadrolinija

Czech feminine given names
Lithuanian feminine given names
Slovak feminine given names
Slovene feminine given names